Guglielmazzo Sanudo, fl. between 1349 and 1362, was a Lord of Gridia.

Ancestry
He was a son of Marco Sanudo, Lord of Gridia, and wife.

Marriage and issue
He married ... and had Nicholas II Sanudo, called Spezzabanda, Lord of Gridia (a fief in Andros)) and eight Consort Duke of the Archipelago, second husband of his cousin Florence Sanudo, seventh Duchess of the Archipelago, with whom he reigned until her death.

Sources

References

 Ancestry of Sultana Nur-Banu (Cecilia Venier-Baffo)

People from the Duchy of the Archipelago
14th-century Greek people
Guglielmazzo
People from the Cyclades
Year of birth unknown
Year of death unknown
History of Andros